José Maria de Almeida (born 2 October 1957), often known as Zé Maria, is a leader of the United Socialist Workers' Party (PSTU).

He was the party's candidate for President of Brazil in the 1998, 2002, 2010, and 2014 elections.

References

External links
campaign website (Portuguese)

Living people
1957 births
United Socialist Workers' Party politicians
Candidates for President of Brazil
Brazilian socialists